The 2005 Vancouver Whitecaps FC season was the club's 19th year of play (or 29th if counting the NASL Whitecaps), as well as their 13th as a Division 2 club in the franchise model of US-based soccer leagues. They played in the now defunct USL First Division which in 2005 was rebranded from A-League and was the highest level of Canadian club soccer.  2005 was Bob Lilley's first season as head coach after Tony Fonseca was released to take on the new District Development Centre Technical Director position with the BCSA.  Under Tony Fonseca the Whitecaps had playoffs qualifications three straight years and advanced to the semifinals once.  Part of the re-organization of BC youth soccer involved the Whitecaps expanding their youth program to ten Super Y League teams.  The Whitecaps were one of only a few US or Canadian clubs with a complete youth system.  MLS teams in 2005 did not have as extensive a club structure.

They started the season strongly going undefeated in their first six matches.  The Whitecaps were hard to beat all year and finished third in the league table.  This was the ninth consecutive playoff appearance for the Whitecaps.  In the playoffs Vancouver had a play-in round series against Richmond Kickers and couldn't find a way to score with both legs of the series finishing 0-0, the Kickers advanced on penalty kicks.  Jason Jordan was named league most value player with seventeen goals.

The name of the league was not the only thing that changed in 2005, so did the league format, from two conferences to a single table.  The schedule was not balanced; it was home and away against every team in the league with additional matches against Seattle, Portland, and Minnesota. Head to head results were the first tie-breaker.  Average attendance increased for the fourth year in a row and was above 5,000 for the first time since 2001.  Three double-headers were played with the Whitecaps Women of the USL W-League.

Off the field, 2005 was the first year (counting NASL Whitecaps) since 1984 that all home and away games had live radio broadcasts.  The games had a thirty-minute pre and post game show, and the AM sports radio station also carried a sixty-minute weekly soccer program early Saturday mornings.  The Whitecaps featured on a weekly local soccer show on Saturday at 2 p.m. as well as on Fox Soccer World twice via the United Soccer League agreement for sixteen weeks of coverage June 17 to October 1.  The partnership with the BCSA for the mid-season friendly with Sunderland A.F.C. was also a success with the largest crowd in five years – 6,857 watching the Whitecaps win 3 – 0.  The Whitecaps played one of their double headers (Women's and Men's teams) at the Apple Bowl in Kelowna, BC on July 9, 2005.  The club also unveiled renderings and details of its Whitecaps Waterfront Stadium proposal publicly on October 13, 2005.  They also had plans announced in 2004, for a training centre for their men's, women's, and youth teams to be shared with the Canadian Women's National Team at Simon Fraser University that had been on hold other than artificial turf field upgrades.

League Tables

Expanded Table

Pre-season

The Whitecaps opened their four-week training camp on March 25, 2005 at Surrey's Newton Athletic Park although most sessions were at Simon Fraser University's Terry Fox Field.   The preseason schedule was announced March 1, 2005.  Note no record can be found of the first match listed and archived whitecapsfc.com headlines imply the match was cancelled.

USL-1

Results by round

April

May

June

July

August

September

Post-season
Play-in Round

Voyaguers Cup
Prior to 2008, from when it has been awarded to the Canadian Championship winners, the men's title was decided on regular-season matches between Canada's USL First Division sides.

Cascadia Cup

Mid-Season Friendly 
Sunderland A.F.C. did a preseason tour with matches against the Vancouver Whitecaps, Seattle Sounders, and Portland Timbers from July 16 – 23, 2005.

Staff
 President – John Rocha
 General Manager – Bob Lenarduzzi
 Office Manager – Lindsay Puchlik
 Communication Manager – Nathan Vanstone
 Director Sales and Marketing – Rick Ramsbottom
 Men's Head Coach – Bob Lilley
 Men's Assistant Coach – Michael Toshack
 Reserve Team Men's Head Coach – 
 Women's Head Coach – Patrick Rohla
 Reserve Team Women's Head Coach – 
 Director Youth Operations – Dan Lenarduzzi

Current roster
The Whitecaps released 2004 rookie defender Justin Thompson, eight year Whitecap veteran forward Oliver Heald, and defender Nico Craveiro.  Justin Thompson played in Europe before playing two seasons for rival Portland Timbers.

The Whitecaps signed Canadian international defender Mark Watson in December 2004.  Midfielder Steve Klein was also signed in the offseason.  At the end of the season, Nick Dasovic, Chris and Mike Franks, and Kevin Harmse all moved on from the Whitecaps.

Jason Jordan scored seventeen goals to win the USL-1 golden boot while Martin Nash was ninth in assists with five and played in every game of the year.

References

Vancouver Whitecaps (1986–2010) seasons